Kaththi is a 2014 Indian Tamil-language action social drama film written and directed by AR Murugadoss and produced by Lyca Productions. The film stars Vijay in a dual role with Samantha, Neil Nitin Mukesh, Tota Roy Chowdhury and Sathish. It focuses on Kathiresan, a petty thief and lookalike of Jeevanantham, who attempts to lead a rebellion by farmers from the latter's village, Thanoothu, and helps them fight against an entrepreneur who exploited Thanoothu's water resources.

It marks the second collaboration of Vijay and Murugadoss, after Thuppakki (2012). Official announcement took place in November 2013, and the principal photography took place in February—September 2014. Primarily shot across Chennai, it was also filmed in Kolkata, Mumbai, Hyderabad, Rajahmundry, Begumpet, Nellore and Kadapa. The cinematography for the film was handled by George C. Williams and the film was edited by A. Sreekar Prasad. The soundtrack and film score is composed by Anirudh Ravichander.

Made on a budget of 70 crore, Kaththi was released worldwide on 22 October 2014, coinciding with Diwali, and received critical acclaim with critics praising Vijay and Neil's performance, technical aspects, background score, soundtrack, cinematography, editing, action sequences, social message, direction and the writing. Before the film's release, it faced controversies for plagiarism allegations, and the business link of Subaskaran, the film's producer, with Sri Lankan president Mahinda Rajapaksa, which resulted Tamil fringe groups to protest against the film. Kaththi was a box-office success and emerged as the second highest-grossing Tamil film of 2014, grossing . It was one of the highest-grossing Tamil films in U.S at that time. The film was remade into Telugu as Khaidi No. 150 (2017), starring Chiranjeevi.

A recipient of various accolades, the film won three out of seven nominations at the Filmfare Awards South, including Filmfare Award for Best Film – Tamil. It won four SIIMA (including Best Film) and two Vijay Awards (Favourite Film and Favourite Director for Murugadoss). Additionally, the film won an IIFA Utsavam and Ananda Vikatan Cinema Awards each, three Edison Awards and a nomination for Best Social Awareness at the Norway Tamil Film Festival Awards, before losing eventually to Sigaram Thodu (2014).

Plot 

In Kolkata, Kathiresan is a prisoner, who helps the police capture an escaping prisoner Vivek Banerjee but escapes afterwards.

Kathiresan goes to Chennai to escape to Bangkok with his friend Ravi. However, he drops this plan after meeting and falling in love with Ankitha, who dupes him into believing that she wants to marry him after realising that he is having a crush on her and gives him a false phone number. Later, Kathir and Ravi notice Jeevanandham, who resembles Kathir, being shot by a group of thugs. They admit him to a hospital, and Kathir decides to impersonate the injured Jeeva to escape from the police. Under Jeeva's name, Kathir and Ravi enter an old-age home run by Jeeva with the intention of stealing  from there for their Bangkok trip, until Kathir learns about Jeeva's mission.

Jeeva was a communist ideologue and post-graduate in hydrology from the arid village of Thanoothu in Tirunelveli district who had discovered groundwater under some lands of the village which could be used as an irrigation source not only for the village, but for the entire Tirunelveli district and the neighbouring Thoothukudi district. However, a greedy entrepreneur named Chirag cheated the villagers into giving their lands for the construction of a factory. Jeeva got arrested, and six villagers committed suicide to bring this news to the media forefront and get Jeeva released. 

Moved by Jeeva's past, Kathir decides to fight for the villagers' cause while still posing as Jeeva. The people of the old home and Kathir go to the jury and try to convince him to go in favour of them, but Kathir starts stating rules and scares the main jury person (whom Chirag had bribed). Kathir then sends a person (disguised as a hairdresser) to Chirag and makes him lay a fingerprint on Chirag's neck. After that, Chirag sends 50 men to kill Kathir, but he defeats them. Meanwhile, Jeeva finds himself in the Kolkata prison. With the help of Vivek, who has heard his story and plans to kill Kathir, he escapes with Vivek's henchmen. Unaware that Jeeva is headed for Chennai with Vivek's henchmen, Kathir makes efforts to convince the media to bring the plight of the villagers to national consciousness, but the media is uninterested as they feel it is not a sensational news. 

A few days later, at the Madras High Court, the judge declares the verdict in favour of Jeeva and the villagers, but adds that Chirag has claimed that certain villagers working abroad have shown their support for the factory. If they cannot prove that their support was faked by Chirag within the next five days, the verdict will go in Chirag's favour. Since the villagers who have denied supporting the factory are abroad and cannot come to Chennai so soon to rebut Chirag's claims as their passports are held by their contractors, Kathir decides on drastic measures to sensationalise the issue. He, Ankitha, Ravi, and the old-age home inmates block water supply to Chennai by sitting on the pipelines which carry water to Chennai from five lakes. With the plight of Chennai people due to no water supply having gained national attention, Kathir comes out of the pipeline after a few days and highlights the villagers' plight to the media. His speech is telecast nationwide. 

By now, Kathir has discovered that Jeeva has escaped and is searching for him. Meanwhile, Jeeva and Vivek's henchmen reach Chennai, but Jeeva is kidnapped by Chirag's henchmen. While in Chirag's custody, he sees Kathir's speech on television and is moved by his efforts to help the villagers. On the night before the verdict, Kathir's bluff is exposed, but he promises the villagers that he will surely help them. He tells them that Jeeva is alive, that he will rescue him from Chirag and hand him back to the villagers with the assurance of a positive verdict. Kathir goes to Chirag's office, rescues Jeeva and kills Chirag. The next day, the verdict is declared in favour of Jeeva and the villagers. Despite the success, Kathir does not take part in the ensuing celebrations. Instead, he surrenders to the police and returns to the Kolkata prison after promising Ankitha, who has now fallen in love with him, that he will marry her once he is released.

Cast

Production

Development 
In February 2013, sources reported that A. R. Murugadoss would collaborate with Vijay again, after the success of Thuppakki (2012). The director had pitched three scripts for the film, with the first one being a romantic drama script, an action film which has Vijay playing a dual role (also being planned as a multi-starrer), and a sequel to Thuppakki. Later, Vijay chose the second script and asked Murugadoss to work on the project. Ayngaran International was reported to produce the film, whose shooting has been planned to begin in late-2013, after Vijay completing the shooting for Jilla, and Murugadoss' completion on the Hindi remake of Thuppakki, titled Holiday: A Soldier Is Never Off Duty.

The project was officially confirmed by Murugadoss on mid-November 2013, through his Twitter page. Subaskaran Allirajah, a British-Sri Lankan based Tamil entrepreneur, agreed to become the major investor in the film, by producing it under his newly backed film distribution and production company Lyca Productions. The film eventually became the first production of the company, with Ayngaran International and Eros International jointly distributing the film.

Murugadoss replaced his usual music director Harris Jayaraj with Anirudh Ravichander signing for the project. George C. Williams, who worked on the director's production Raja Rani (2013), was signed as the cinematographer. Art director Lalgudi N. Ilayaraja was selected to handle the production design. The film was earlier rumoured to be titled as Dheeran and Vaal. However, in March 2014, Murugadoss confirmed that the film would be titled Kaththi and that it was scheduled to be released on Diwali. In June 2014, Murugadoss speaking in an interview, dismissed claims of being a gangster film, and Vijay playing father-son role in the film, and added that the film will be set in Chennai.

Casting 
Murugadoss stated that Vijay will play dual roles in the film, and his character names were revealed as Kathiresan and Jeevanantham. Even before the film was officially announced, Samantha Ruth Prabhu was selected as the female lead in September 2013, whose character was named Ankita. Speaking about her role in the film, Murugadoss stated that "Samantha has exceeded my expectations for the role [...] She always carries a smiling face and bring a lot of energy on the sets and has added more flavor to every scene."

Bengali actor Tota Roy Chowdhury was signed for a pivotal role in the film. According to The Times of India, he was reported to play an international gangster named Vivek Banerjee. In March 2014,  Neil Nitin Mukesh was selected to play the antagonist, thereby making his début in Tamil cinema through the film. Neil was inspired by his look in his début film, Johnny Gaddaar (2007). He described his character as one who does not "fight the hero with physical power, but with intelligence". He learned Tamil for his role, as he did not want to speak his dialogues without understanding their meaning. Neil had lost weight for the role and modelled his looks to be along the lines of Brad Pitt and David Beckham. Sathish was chosen to play a supporting role.

Filming 
The film was launched in Kolkata on 3 February 2014 by Lyca Productions with a pooja ceremony in front of the Kalighat Kali Temple, after which principal photography began. A fight sequence was canned in this schedule for 7 days, and later the team returned to Chennai on 10 February 2014, for a song shoot which took place at Chennai International Airport from 14 to 17 February, with special permissions being procured to shoot at the runway. On 20 February, the team headed to Hyderabad for shooting a major 30-day schedule at Rajahmundry and Begumpet. After a break for two-weeks, shooting resumed on 13 March in Hyderabad with another song being shot at Ramoji Film City.

Shooting continued for a 40-day-long schedule in and around the city by 2 June 2014. In between, Murugadoss, took a break to promote his then upcoming Bollywood film, Holiday: A Soldier Is Never Off Duty (2014) in Mumbai. After Murugadoss returned to Chennai on 8 June, followed by location scouting, shooting of the film resumed, the following day. On 26 June 2014, the team headed to Kadapa for a 12-day schedule, by July 2014, 60% of the shooting.

The final leg of the film began on 1 August 2014 at Chennai. In late August 2014, 15 days of filming, including patch-work and a few fight sequences, remained. Filming moved back to Hyderabad, where the rest of the fight sequences were canned. On 1 September 2014, the second half of the film was nearly completed. Additional filming took place at the Chennai Central railway station. On 4 September 2014, Neil Nitin Mukesh dubbed in Tamil himself for his role and completed his dubbing portions for the first half of the film. The climax sequences were shot in Nellore on 23 September 2014 and talkie portions have also been completed within two days. The song "Selfie Pulla" was shot in Mumbai, with about 100 dancers participated in the song sequence. Filming of that track was completed on 30 September 2014, with the filming of the entire film also being completed as a result.

Themes and influences 
As similar to the actor-director's previous film Thuppakki (2012), which is based on terrorism caused by sleeper cells, Kaththi, deals with the suicide of farmers due to corporate encroachment. The film also deals with several themes such as water scarcity, corruption, communism, the ill-effects of capitalism and industralisation and problems faced by farmers in daily lives. The character Jeevanantham, is named after a social activist, whom Murugadoss had inspired. An article published by Behindwoods, listed its similarities with that of Rajinikanth's Lingaa, which was released on the same year, that highlighted the main plot and character traits of the protagonists. Rockline Venkatesh, the producer of Lingaa, denied the connection of the film's script with that of Kaththi.

In the film, the character Jeevanantham (Vijay), in a single dialogue, illustrates about the basic tenets of communism using idlies. In the press meet scene, Kathiresan (Vijay) spoke dialogues about several political incidents, that included 2G spectrum case, and encroachment of Pepsi company in the banks of river Thamirabharani. In October 2014, a petition was filed against Vijay and Murugadoss regarding the 2G spectrum case, and slammed them for defamation. The complainant R. Ramasubramanian questioned how a film can conclude that all those involved in the 2G spectrum case are corrupt when the case is still being heard in court, adding that the dialogue portrayed all those people in poor light and damaged their dignity. The court however, dismissed those claims later.

Sowmya Rajendran of The News Minute called Kaththi as what "Kollywood likes to call a "message" film made in a mainstream format" and the enormous success of the film "coupled with the general public mood (on social media especially) after the jallikattu protests of 2017, which have made the "farmer sentiment" so popular on screen".

Music 

The soundtrack and film score is composed by Anirudh Ravichander, in his first collaboration with Vijay and Murugadoss. Before signing the project, Anirudh had composed the theme music of the film, which was accompanied with the motion poster was released on YouTube on 22 June 2014, coinciding with actor Vijay's birthday. The album was under production from late-2013 and continued until September 2014. The soundtrack album consists of seven tracks, with lyrics written by Madhan Karky, Yugabharathi, Pa. Vijay and Hiphop Tamizha. The album, in its entirety was released on 24 September 2014, at the audio launch event held at The Leela Palace Hotel in Chennai. The songs as well as the film score was widely appreciated; On 28 January 2015, the crew released the film's original background score through YouTube, to coincide with the film's 100-day celebration.

Marketing
Murugadoss roped in creative designer Gopi Prasanna to work on the promotional materials of the film. The first look and motion poster was released on 21 June 2014, coinciding with the eve of Vijay's birthday (22 June 2014). The first look featured a still of Vijay being made with a collage of newspaper headlines. The motion poster featured a creative design of prominent places in Chennai, and the entire city itself recreated and draped in the form of news headlines, and the final image, the still from the poster, in the end. According to Prasanna, Kaththi became the first mainstream Tamil film to introduce first looks. He did not use the photograph of actor Vijay in the design, and created a newspaper collage to resemble Vijay's face. The production team being sceptical of the idea, but after the release, he was later appreciated for his creative efforts. Within a week, the motion poster, crossed more than 1 million views.

The official teaser of the film was released on 24 September 2014, coinciding with the film's audio launch event. An Android game based on the film was launched during early-October, with the 3D and 2D versions of the game being released through Google Play Store and Windows Store. The trailer of the film was unveiled on 19 October 2014, three days ahead of the film's release, and got positive response from viewers. Before the theatrical release, the film's posters were branded in the AC coaches of Parasuram Express which travels through Nagercoil to Mangalore via Kerala, and at inter-state buses in Kerala and Karnataka. Post release, two events were held to commemorate the film's successful theatrical run; one being held at Coimbatore on 27 October 2014, and another event at Tirunelveli on 14 December 2014, to coincide the film's 50th day theatrical run.

Release
Kaththi was released on 22 October 2014, coinciding with the Diwali festival. The film was released in more than 1300 screens worldwide. The film released in 400 screens in Tamil Nadu, and 200 screens in Kerala, setting a record at screen count. In overseas, the film was released in US in 105 screens, which is considered as the biggest Tamil release in the country, and in Canada, the film released on 21 screens. The film released in United Kingdom on 70 screens, and in France on 24 screens. The film released in Sri Lanka, on 28 screens, and in Australia on 16 screens. The film was released in Malaysia on 120 screens, which is highest for a Tamil film at that time.

The satellite rights of the film were sold to Jaya TV. Shibu Thameens purchased the Kerala theatrical rights. The theatrical rights in Tiruchirappalli and Thanjavur were sold to T. Siva of Boss Films. Prominent film producer Tagore Madhu acquired the theatrical rights in Andhra Pradesh and Telangana. MM Media, previously known as GK Media, acquired the film's theatrical rights in the USA. Goldie Films acquired the theatrical distribution rights in Karnataka. The film was sold out in all the territories, nine days before the film's theatrical release.

The Telugu-dubbed version, which was planned to release along with the Tamil version, was pushed to 31 October 2014 and later to 21 November. The dubbed version was dropped, in favour of a Telugu remake titled Khaidi No. 150, which was planned by the producer. The film was also dubbed and released in Hindi under the title Khaki Aur Khiladi. and was released through YouTube in 2017.

Controversies

Plagiarism allegations 
The 41-second first-look motion poster drew comparisons with the popular minute-long advertisement campaign run by a Turkish newspaper, Sabah, to announce their distribution of the New York Times as a supplement. The original advertisement features iconic images of the cities of New York City and Istanbul, designed using news articles and headlines from the newspaper to show the two cities in the form of newspaper clippings. The motion poster of the film showed prominent places in Chennai and the entire city itself in the form of newspaper clippings and headlines, just like the advertisement campaign, without an acknowledgement to the makers of the original.

Minjur Gopi Nayinar filed a case against Murugadoss, claiming that the plot of the film was copied from his novel Mootha Kudi. Responding to the issue, Murugadoss said that he was neither aware of Minjur nor that his story was a copy, further citing the allegation as a tactic by the plaintiff to garner free publicity. He, in turn, requested the court to dismiss the petition. In late-September 2014, the court declared the case in Murugadoss's favour, citing lack of proper evidence found against him.

Anbu Rajasekar, a short film director also claimed the plagiarism allegation, levied against Murugadoss saying that the plot was lifted from his 2013 short film Thaaga Bhoomi, which was selected at the Norway Tamil Film Festival and also won second prize in a short film contest judged by Director Balu Mahendra. He further shared a scene-to-scene comparison of the short film with Kaththi to further substantiate his claim and wrote a letter to Murugadoss on late-October, claiming that his story was used in the film without permission. Since, there was no favourable reply from the director, he filed a case in the Thanjavur High Court against Vijay, Murugadoss, Lyca Productions and the cinematographer George C. Williams. The case went on for four years, and since there is no development, Anbu with his family, subjected to a 10-day hunger strike from 31 October to 10 November 2018, and also filed a petition signed by over 100 villagers, which was submitted to the office of Edappadi K. Palaniswami, the then-Chief Minister of Tamil Nadu. In December 2019, the Madras High Court dismissed the proceedings against Vijay, Lyca and three others, saying that "there was no material against them about the allegations of plagiarism and the short film had not been registered under the Copyright Act, 1957".

Business link allegations 

Subaskaran Allirajah, chairman of Lyca Mobiles, whose company Lyca Productions co-produced the film along with Ayngaran International, was claimed to have had business links with the President of Sri Lanka, Mahinda Rajapaksa. Murugadoss and Karunamoorthy of Ayngaran International met pro-Eelam leaders – Pazha Nedumaran, director Seeman and Viduthalai Chiruthaigal Katchi's (VCK) Thol. Thirumavalavan — to explain their position regarding the allegation, but the talks proved to be inconclusive at that time. A collective of four student bodies – Maatram Maanavar Ilaiyor Iyakkam, Free Tamil Eelam Students Organisation, Tamil Youth and Students Association, and Progressive Students Front – in Tamil Nadu called for a ban on the film, stating that the film promoted the economic and political interests of Sri Lanka. The students were willing to reconsider their position on the film if Lyca Productions formally withdrew as producer. In August 2014, directors Seeman and Vikraman showed support for the film.
	
Despite clarifications, as many as 65 Tamil groups came together to oppose the film, leading to speculations regarding Lyca stepping down as producer and handing the reins to another production group. Karunamoorthy, however, again denied that Allirajah had business links with either Mahinda Rajapaksa or his family in any way, further saying that a press meet would be held where all doubts and suspicions regarding Lyca Productions would be clarified and that the film would be released under the Lyca Productions banner. As per Karunamoorthy's statement, a press meet was held on 16 September 2014, where the vice-chairman of Lyca Productions, Premananthan Sivasamy, Subaskaran and Karunamoorthy were present. A statement with a detailed clarification was shown in which it was mentioned that Lyca did not have any business links with Rajapaksa or anyone else related to him, thereby confirming the planned release of the film on Diwali.

A meeting with the pro-Tamil groups, with Tamil Nadu Theatre Owners Association, exhibitors and distributors was held, three days before the release and after a favourable response, the theatre owners officially confirmed the planned release. However, on 20 October, few members from the Tamil groups had damaged the properties and glass panes at Sathyam cinemas and Woodlands Cinemas, which resulted in huge trouble before its release. Later, actor Vijay confirmed that the issues with the pro-Tamils' have been resolved and Lyca Productions' name being removed from the film and its promotional materials, thereby meeting their demands. He also thanked the then-Chief Minister of Tamil Nadu, J. Jayalalithaa for extending the support towards the film's release.

Reception

Box office

Kaththi netted around  worldwide on the opening day of its release (22 October 2014). The film collected  in Tamil Nadu alone on its opening day, and registered the best opening collections in Trichy, Thanjavur, Tirunelveli, Kanyakumari and Madurai. It reported a full 100% occupancy on the film's opening day, despite the controversies, delayed advance bookings and low-key promotions.

In the extended-five day weekend, the film collected  at the worldwide box office, and became the actor's first film to cross the  mark worldwide, in a quick-span of time. In Chennai city alone, the film netted  in the first week with an average theatre occupancy of 97% and stood in the first position. It surpassed the collections of Velaiilla Pattadhari, Maan Karate, Veeram and Jilla at Chennai box-office.

Kaththi reached the   mark in 12 days of its release. The film took a worldwide distributor share of  within twelve days of its release. The film was bought for a record price in Karnataka by a leading distributor, and opened well at the box-office there. Kaththi completed a 100 days theatrical run on 29 January 2015. In its final theatrical run, the film grossed an estimated  worldwide, making it one of the highest grossing Tamil films of all time and the second highest-grossing Tamil film of 2014, behind Lingaa.

The film earned $142,805 in its USA premiere on 21 October 2014. It is considered to be an "all-time record for a non-Rajinikanth film in the US" and became the second Tamil-film to gross $100,000 besides and surpassing Enthiran (2010). Within five days of its release, the film surpassed the $5,00,000 mark. Kaththi became the highest grossing Tamil film of 2014 in US. The distributor Ayngaran International stated that Kaththi had the biggest opening for a Tamil film in UK since it released in over 70 screens there and also topped the weekend box office in Malaysia. It also has set new records in Singapore grossing over $201,408. In the UK box office it grossed £319,310 in 12 days. In Australia, Kaththi collected $160,890 and has surpassed the opening weekend collection of Kochadaiyaan ($119,597) and Anjaan ($107,013) for 2014. The film had a lifetime business of over A$194,341 in Australia and became the highest grossing Tamil film of the year there. The film made approximately $1.86 million in Malaysia and has emerged as the third highest Tamil grosser.

Critical response
Kaththi received critical acclaim from critics. Prakash Upadhyaya of International Business Times gave the film 4 out of 5 and called it as "a message-oriented and highly entertaining commercial movie" and further wrote "Vijay, in two roles, steals the show in Kaththi. His strong screen presence adds a huge value to the project. His co-star Samantha is just his an arm candy but Neil Nitin Mukesh looks rich in stylish costumes. Rest other characters have played their parts well. And the director himself appears in one scene and it gets huge applause from the audience." Critic based at Sify gave it 4 out of 5 and stated, "the movie is a well made entertainer with a powerful message". Behindwoods gave it 3 out of 5 and stated, "Murugadoss delivers a strong commercial movie with a nice social angle, in true Vijay style". M. Suganth of The Times of India gave 3.5 stars out of 5 and wrote, "Kaththi will definitely be picked up by a big Bollywood star for a remake, for the knife was bang on target".

S. Saraswathi of Rediff stated, "Kaththi attempts to highlight the pathetic condition of farmers, whose lives are being destroyed by callous multinational corporations" and rated it 3/5 as well. Baradwaj Rangan of The Hindu wrote "The ideas are snappy – the reveal of the person injured in a shootout; the identity of a couple of television reporters – but the staging is shockingly flat." Writing for India Today, Haricharan Pudipeddi gave 2.5 out of 5 and summarised "Kaththi is a commercial film and naturally audiences except some heroism, action and romance in it. But here Murugadoss has portrayed his hero as a messiah, a man of the masses willing to even sacrifice his life." Umesh Punwani of Koimoi gave 2.5 out of 5 and stated that "Kaththi picks up slowly, but delivered a power packed performance." Ananda Vikatan rated the film 42 out of 100.

Anupama Subramanian of Deccan Chronicle gave 3.5 out of 5 stars and stated, "Vijay as Kathiresan in an author backed role does a neat job to satiate his fans playing his role packing with punches, humor, romance , right emotions and of course his forte – breezy dance movements. Vijay’s lengthy speech with the press towards the end earns lot of appreciation. On the contrary, the director has etched a weak characterization for Jeevanandham, who fights for a cause, but beyond that he is projected neither brainy nor brawny. Murugadoss brings to the fore critical social issues like farmers suicide, water scarcity, etc, but at times it looks too preachy. Wish Murugadoss could have opted for a tauter screenplay." Indiaglitz gave 3.25 out of 5 and stated "Vijay & Murugadoss have redefined the term ‘commercial’ once again and delivered a perfect diwali treat for the Tamil audience." Moviecrow gave 3.25 out of 5 and stated "The movie deserves a lot of credit for taking a social cause and delivering it sincerely with just the right amount of commercial elements."

Accolades
Kaththi received eight nominations at the 62nd edition of Filmfare Awards South and won three — Best Film, Best Director (Murugadoss) and Best Dance Choreographer (Shobi). It was nominated at ten categories at the 9th Vijay Awards, winning two — Favourite Film and Favourite Director (Murugadoss), and seven categories at the 4th South Indian International Movie Awards and won four awards: Best Film, Best Actor in a Negative Role (Neil), Best Fight Choreographer (Anal Arasu) and Best Dance Choreographer (Shobi). It was nominated in three categories at the inaugural IIFA Utsavam awards, where it fetched the award for Best Music Director (Ravichander), the only win in that ceremony. Among other wins, the film received three Edison Awards and one Ananda Vikatan Cinema Awards. It also received a nomination for Best Social Awareness at the Norway Tamil Film Festival Awards, but it lost to Sigaram Thodu (2014).

Remakes
The film's Telugu remake was eventually planned by few distributors before the release, but in November 2014, the distributor B. Madhu had claimed that there will not be a Telugu remake of this film. In April 2015, plans for adapting the film in Telugu-language eventually processed with N. T. Rama Rao Jr. playing the lead role. In October, it was announced that Chiranjeevi will star in the remake, which will be directed by V. V. Vinayak and will be his 150th film as a lead actor, and was officially confirmed in December 2015, with Chiranjeevi's son Ram Charan making his debut as a producer, by financing the project under Konidela Production Company. The film titled Khaidi No. 150, was directed by V. V. Vinayak and released in January 2017. In July 2019, it was reported that the film will be remade in Hindi as Ikka (2021), starring Akshay Kumar and will be directed by Jagan Shakti. The film expected to beigin production in late-2019, was shelved in December 2020, after the co-producer Fox Star Studios exit from film production in India.

Legacy 
Kaththi eventually featured in the list of "Best Tamil Films of 2014" by various publications including The Hindu and Sify. According to Nivedita Mishra of Hindustan Times, the film "set records through box-office and social media". Srivatsan S. of The Hindu called it as one of the "best masala films of the decade in Tamil cinema" and one of the "films with best 'mass' music being featured in the last decade in Tamil cinema". Kaththi which became the first in mainstream Tamil cinema to introduce the concept of "first look" and "motion poster", became one of the "best first looks designed for Vijay's films" according to Times News Network. Kaththi was also the first Tamil film that did not contain disclaimer about smoking and drinking, as there were no smoking or drinking scenes being featured in the film. Other films which followed the similar pattern, were Miruthan (2016), Spyder (2017), Thaanaa Serndha Koottam (2018) and Hero (2019).

Social media and news articles cited that Kaththi became one of Vijay's films that elevated him to the path of super-stardom, that eventually continued after the success of Mersal (2017), Sarkar (2018) and Bigil (2019). Irrespective of the controversies, the film became a profitable venture for its producers Lyca Productions. The film's success also led Lyca Productions' to become one of the popular film production and distribution studios in Tamil cinema, and had produced several Tamil films, whose notable ventures include Naanum Rowdy Dhaan (2015), Visaranai (2016), Kolamaavu Kokila, Vada Chennai and 2.0 (2018), which was considered to be the most expensive Indian film to date.

Kaththi's success led several filmmakers to direct films based on agriculture and problems faced by farmers. The interest eventually shown a steeping growth after the 2017 pro-jallikattu protests and the month-long Tamil Nadu Farmers protest happened in the same year, with film-makers covering the subject to cope up with the general sentiments of the public. As a result, several Tamil films based on farming and agriculture were produced in the last few years. Sowmya Rajendran of The News Minute had said that "From 'mother sentiment', films have now moved to ‘farmer sentiment’". In its article to The Hindu, about the "decade’s top 10 trends in Tamil cinema", editors Srinivasa Ramanujam, Srivatsan S., Pradeep Kumar and Gautam Sunder opined that the farmer's issue is "the hottest sub-genre in Tamil cinema, and has become an easy gateway for filmmakers to package 'valuable' messages". This eventually became a subject of criticism from cinephiles, as the trope being felt "repetitive" and "formulaic" and the commercial factors divert the "message regarding the problems faced by farmers in India".

Popular culture 
The scene where Kathiresan (Vijay) visualises a floor plan in three-dimensions was parodied by Neeraj Madhav in Adi Kapyare Kootamani (2015) and Sivakarthikeyan in Rajinimurugan (2016). Kathiresan's introduction in the pipeline was spoofed by Vishal in Kaththi Sandai. In the 2017 film Balloon, actor Jai walks with an iron rod to beat up a group of goons, which was similar to the coin fight scene in the film, and the instrumental theme "The Sword of Destiny" was mimicked in the background. Jai's character in the film was named Jeevandhanam, similar to one of the characters played by Vijay. The extended press conference scene featured in the film was spoofed in Tamizh Padam 2 (2018).

The 2019 Tamil film Boomerang, was said to be heavily inspired from the film, as the lead actor Atharvaa played dual roles and it also dealt with farmers' issue, similar to this film. The Telugu film Maharshi, which was released on the same year, starring Mahesh Babu has said to be influenced by Kaththi as both the film's focus on agriculture. Janani K. of India Today gave a mixed review for the film and wrote: "Mahesh Babu gets his own underwhelming Kaththi".

Notes

References

External links 
 

2014 films
2010s Tamil-language films
2014 action drama films
2010s vigilante films
Indian action drama films
Tamil films remade in other languages
Films directed by AR Murugadoss
Films scored by Anirudh Ravichander
Films about corruption in India
Films about farmers' suicides in India
Films about social issues in India
Films about water scarcity
Films about poverty in India
Indian business films
Films about communism
Films about water
Films about agriculture
Films shot in Andhra Pradesh
Indian prison films
Indian vigilante films
Films set in prison
Films set in Kolkata
Films set in Chennai
Indian nonlinear narrative films
Films shot in Chennai
Films shot in Kolkata
Films shot in Mumbai
Films shot in Hyderabad, India
Films shot in Rajahmundry
2010s business films
2010s masala films
Water scarcity in fiction
Films involved in plagiarism controversies
Film controversies in India
Films about lookalikes
Indian intellectual property law